Meskhi is a Georgian surname. Notable people with the surname include:
 Leila Meskhi (born 1968), Georgian tennis player
 Mikheil Meskhi (born 1937), Georgian football player
 Mykhaylo Meskhi (born 1997), Ukrainian football player

Surnames of Georgian origin
Georgian-language surnames